Eugene Stewart Young is an American diplomat who has served as the United States ambassador to the Republic of the Congo since 2022.

Education 

Raised in Lockport, New York, Young graduated from Lockport Senior High School in 1980. He earned his Bachelor of Arts in international studies from Miami University and a Master of Arts in international affairs from the Elliott School at George Washington University.

Career 

Young is a career member of the Senior Foreign Service. He was the Chargé d’Affaires and Deputy Chief of Mission of the U.S. embassy in Vienna, Austria; the Consul and Senior Civilian Representative of the U.S. Consulate in Herat, Afghanistan; and the Deputy Chief of Mission of the U.S. Embassy in Ljubljana, Slovenia. Among his other assignments, Young served as the economic counselor of the U.S. Embassy in Nairobi, Kenya, the Consul General of the U.S. Consulate General in Durban, South Africa, and as a Special Assistant in the Office of the Deputy Secretary of State. He is serving as the economic counselor of the U.S. Embassy in Jerusalem, Israel.

Ambassador to the Republic of the Congo
On April 15, 2021, President Joe Biden nominated Young to be the next United States Ambassador to the Republic of the Congo. The Senate Foreign Relations Committee held hearings on his nomination on June 9, 2021. The committee reported his nomination favorably on June 24, 2021. Young was confirmed on December 18, 2021, by the entire Senate via voice vote. He presented his credentials to President Denis Sassou N’Guesso on March 30, 2022.

Personal life
Young speaks German, French, Slovene, Slovak, and Serbo-Croatian.

See also
Ambassadors of the United States

References

Living people
Year of birth missing (living people)
Place of birth missing (living people)
21st-century American diplomats
American consuls
Elliott School of International Affairs alumni
Miami University alumni
People from Lockport, New York
United States Foreign Service personnel
Ambassadors of the United States to the Republic of the Congo